Rare Disease Day is an observance held on the last day of February to raise awareness for rare diseases and improve access to treatment and medical representation for individuals with rare diseases and their families. The European Organisation for Rare Diseases established the day in 2008 to raise awareness for unknown or overlooked illnesses. According to that organization, treatment for many rare diseases is insufficient, as are the social networks to support individuals with rare diseases and their families; furthermore, while there were already numerous days dedicated to individuals with specific diseases (such as AIDS, cancer, etc.), there had previously not been a day for representing those affected by rare diseases. In 2009, Rare Disease Day went global as the National Organization for Rare Disorders mobilized 200 rare disease patient advocacy organizations in the United States while organizations in China, Australia, Taiwan, and Latin America also lead efforts in their respective countries to coordinate activities and promote the day.

History
The first Rare Disease Day was coordinated by the European Organisation for Rare Diseases (EURORDIS) and held on February 29, 2008, in numerous European nations and in Canada through the Canadian Organization for Rare Disorders. The date was chosen because February 29 is a "rare day," and 2008 was the 25th anniversary of the passing of the Orphan Drug Act in the United States.

Individuals observing Rare Disease Day took part in walks and press conferences to raise public awareness of rare diseases, organized fundraisers, and wrote en masse to government representatives; health-related non-profit organizations across numerous countries also held events, gatherings, and campaigns. The day also included an open session of the European Parliament specifically dedicated to discussing policy issues relating to rare diseases. The days leading up to Rare Disease Day included other policy-related events in numerous locations, such as a reception in the British Parliament where policymakers met with individuals with rare diseases to discuss issues such as "equal access and availability of prevention, diagnosis, treatment and rehabilitation."

In 2009, Rare Disease Day was observed for the first time in Panama, Colombia, Argentina, Australia, Serbia, Russia, the People's Republic of China, and the United States. In the United States, the National Organization for Rare Disorders signed on to coordinate Rare Disease Day and collaborated with The Discovery Channel and the show Mystery Diagnosis, as well about 180 other partners, to organize activities across the country for the observance of Rare Disease Day. Several United States state governments issued proclamations regarding Rare Disease Day. In Europe, over 600 patient advocacy and support organizations, again coordinated by EURORDIS, also planned events.

In 2010, 46 countries participated. Latvia, Lithuania, Slovenia, Georgia, and three African countries joined the event for the first time. In 2011, 46 countries participated in the event. By 2012, thousands of patient advocacy organizations had gotten involved, including more than 600 partners working with NORD in the US to promote Rare Disease Day.

By 2014, 84 countries were participating, with over four hundred events worldwide. Nine new countries participated in 2014; Cuba, Ecuador, Egypt, Guinea, Jordan, Kazakhstan, Kenya, Oman, and Paraguay. In 2018, Cape Verde, Ghana, Syria, Togo, and Trinidad and Tobago participated for the first time, with 80 nations participating in that year's events.

See also
 :Category:Rare diseases
 World Health Observances

References

External links
 Rare Disease Day official site
 Rare Disease Day US official US site

February observances
Health awareness days
Recurring events established in 2008